Hurry, Charlie, Hurry is a 1941 American comedy film directed by Charles E. Roberts and written by Paul Gerard Smith. The film stars Leon Errol, Mildred Coles, Kenneth Howell, Cecil Cunningham and George Watts. The film was released on June 13, 1941, by RKO Pictures.

Plot

A banker urges his daughter to elope and pretends to know the U.S. vice president.

Cast 
Leon Errol as Daniel Jennings Boone
Mildred Coles as Beatrice Boone
Kenneth Howell as Jerry Grant
Cecil Cunningham as Mrs. Diana Boone
George Watts as Horace Morris
Eddie Conrad as Wagon Track
Noble Johnson as Chief Poison Arrow
Douglas Walton as Michael Prescott
Renee Godfrey as Josephine Whitley 
Georgia Caine as Mrs. Georgia Whitley
Lalo Encinas as Frozen Foot

References

External links 
 

1941 films
American black-and-white films
RKO Pictures films
1941 comedy films
American comedy films
1940s English-language films
1940s American films